Ken Novak (born July 3, 1954) is a former an American football player who played defensive tackle in the National Football League (NFL) in the 1970s. He played college football at Purdue University and was drafted by the Baltimore Colts in the 1976 NFL Draft.

Novakattended Saint Mary Magdalene grade school in Willowick, Ohio. He went to St. Joseph High School in Cleveland, where he played football and basketball.

References

1954 births
Living people
American football defensive tackles
Baltimore Colts players
Purdue Boilermakers football players
People from Willowick, Ohio
Players of American football from Cleveland
American people of Slovenian descent